Flitcham with Appleton is a civil parish in the English county of Norfolk. The population, including the parish of Anmer, was 276 at the 2011 Census.

The parish includes the village of Flitcham as well as the sites of the deserted medieval villages of Appleton and Little Appleton. The ruined church of St Mary, the former parish church of Appleton, dates from at least the 11th century. Its ruined round tower remains standing and is a Grade II* listed building.

For the purposes of local government, the parish falls within the district of King's Lynn and West Norfolk.

References

External links
St Mary's on the European Round Tower Churches Website

Civil parishes in Norfolk
King's Lynn and West Norfolk